Daimari Beach is a large, secluded beach and bay on the northern coast of Aruba, on the north end of Arikok National Park.

References

Beaches of Aruba